David Korins (born August 4, 1976) is a creative director and the principal designer of Korins.

Career 
Korins has designed more than 20 Broadways shows including Hamilton (Tony Award nomination), Dear Evan Hansen, Beetlejuice (Tony Award nomination), and Mrs. Doubtfire.

David Korins served as creative director for musicians including Lady Gaga, Bruno Mars, Kanye West, Mariah Carey (Number 1 to Infinity, All I Want for Christmas Is You) Andrea Bocelli, and Sia.

Television credits include the 91st Academy Awards (Emmy Award Nomination), 94th Academy Awards (Emmy Award Nomination), Grease: Live (Emmy Award), Watch What Happens Live, and "Elton John: I'm Still Standing – A Grammy Salute."

Korins has created exhibitions for Sotheby's, Gagosian Gallery, and the USC Shoah Foundation. Korins also provides consulting for brands including Google, Spotify, YouTube, and Microsoft.

Korins currently serves as Global Creative Director of Lighthouse Immersive, producing the highest selling ticketed experience in North America 2021, Immersive Van Gogh. Following the success of Van Gogh, he went on to create the Disney Animation Immersive Experience, an experience that celebrates all 100 years of Disney animation using unprecedented access to the entire Disney archive.

Broadway 

Mrs. Doubtfire
 The Great Society
Beetlejuice (Tony Award Nomination)
Bandstand
War Paint (Tony Award Nomination)
Dear Evan Hansen
 Misery
Hamilton (Tony Award Nomination)
Motown The Musical
Vanya and Sonia and Masha and Spike
Annie
Bring It On The Musical
Magic/Bird
 An Evening with Patti LuPone and Mandy Patinkin
Godspell
Chinglish
The Pee-wee Herman Show
Lombardi
Passing Strange
Bridge & Tunnel

Television 
 94th Academy Awards
 The Big Brunch
 91st Academy Awards (Emmy Award Nomination)
 Elton John: I'm Still Standing - A Grammy Salute 
 Grease: Live (Emmy Award)
 Watch What Happens Live
 Carrie Fisher: Wishful Drinking
The Webby Awards
 Nickelodeon Halo Awards
CBS News: 50 Years Later, Civil Rights
 XQ Super School Live
 Tracy Morgan: Bona Fide
 John Oliver's New York Stand-Up Show
 The Climate Reality Project
 Onion News Network
 Make Me a Supermodel

Film 

 Hamilton (2020 film)
 Bandstand
 Blackbird
 Winter Passing
 The Pee-wee Herman Show

Music & concerts 

 Lady Gaga (American Music Awards, Saturday Night Live)
 Bruno Mars (American Music Awards, Saturday Night Live, New Year's Eve - Las Vegas)
 Mariah Carey (Number 1 to Infinity, All I Want for Christmas Is You)
 Kanye West (Coachella, SXSW, Lollapalooza)
 Andrea Bocelli (Cinema World Tour)
 Sia
 Bonnaroo
 Outside Lands

Personal life 
Korins was raised in Mansfield, Massachusetts and graduated from University of Massachusetts Amherst. Korins has two children. Korins is divorced.

Awards and nominations 
Korins has been awarded an Emmy Award, Lortel Award, an Obie Award for Sustained Excellence in Design, two Drama Desk Awards, three Henry Hewes Design Awards, and three Tony Award nominations for Best Scenic Design in a Musical.

References

External links 
 Korins - official site

1976 births
Living people
Primetime Emmy Award winners